Kaštel Štafilić is a town within the administrative area of Kaštela in Dalmatia, Croatia.
The oldest tree in Croatia, an olive tree estimated to be over 1,500 years old, is in Kaštela.

Sites

City Square

Kastel Stafilic's most majestic feature, is its old stone village, with its main square. It is situated on a long seafront, home to numerous summer festivals, and events.

One aspect that unites all the Kastelas, is a common promenade, where one can visit 6 other Kastelas, or go West, and take a leisurely stroll until they finally get to Trogir.

Castle Rotondo

Castle Rotondo is a 508 year old castle, situated by a sea cliff. It is named after the noble family, Rotondo who owned, and inhabited for 400 years. It was initially built on an island, but was later linked to the land with a movable bridge. Its purpose was to protect the villagers from the pillaging of the Ottomans.

Mastrinka - Old Olive Tree
 
The Mastrinka Olive Tree is more than 1500 years old. It shows that the processing and cultivation of olive trees in Kastela has taken place since ancient times. The tree is 11 meters high, with a radius of 23 m. The trunk is dry and hollow, but over the years around it has grown new branches and shoots.

The oil obtained from the olives, on the olive tree, is sold as a souvenir in small bottles in the town museum, in Kastela. In 1990, the tree was officially inducted into UNESCO's World Heritage List.

Nehaj Tower

Fortress Nehaj was erected in 1558, and served as a military stronghold when the Turks, and Venice were at the height of their power. This  and  fortress could be reached by staircases via wooden bridge through narrow double gate The powerful walls 3.30 m thick narrowing towards the top ended with crenel and five small corner towers.

See also
 Kaštela
 Kaštel Gomilica
 Kaštel Kambelovac
 Kaštel Lukšić
 Kaštel Novi
 Kaštel Stari
 Kaštel Sućurac

References

MILA SKOPLJANAC- je-sus

External links
 

Populated places in Split-Dalmatia County